Kenneth Lee Wregget (born March 25, 1964) is a Canadian former professional ice hockey goaltender.  

His professional hockey career spans nearly 20 years, playing in the National Hockey League for the Toronto Maple Leafs, Philadelphia Flyers, Pittsburgh Penguins, Calgary Flames, and Detroit Red Wings. 

He won the Stanley Cup in 1992 while with the Pittsburgh Penguins, serving as backup to Tom Barrasso.

Playing career
He played for the Toronto Maple Leafs, Philadelphia Flyers, Pittsburgh Penguins, Calgary Flames, and Detroit Red Wings of the National Hockey League from 1983 through 2000. He then played one season for the Manitoba Moose of the International Hockey League in 2000–2001 before retiring at the age of 37.

Wregget played for three seasons with the Lethbridge Broncos of the Western Hockey League and won the WHL Top Goaltender Award in 1984. In 1983, he joined the St. Catharines Saints, the Toronto AHL affiliate, after being drafted by the Toronto Maple Leafs in the third round of the 1982 NHL Entry Draft, 45th overall. He split time for two seasons between St. Catharines and the Maple Leafs.

Toronto Maple Leafs
He made his NHL debut during the 1983-84 season while still playing junior with the Lethbridge Hurricanes suiting up for three games for the Maple Leafs.  He turned a lot of heads during his first game in the league posting a jaw-dropping 48-save performance against the Hartford Whalers to record his first NHL victory.   He then he split time the next two seasons between St. Catharines and the Maple Leafs.  In '84-'85 he played 23 games for the Leafs while Tim Bernhardt handled the bulk of the work then got into 30 games the next year as part of a three-netminder carousel that also featured Bernhardt and veteran Don Edwards. The 1986–87 season was his first full year in the NHL with Wregget taking over the starting duties for the Maple Leafs with another youngster, Allan Bester, making up the tandem. The following year the Leafs used the same pair for the bulk of the work with Wregget appearing in 56 games for the second consecutive season. In 1988-89, Bester, like he had the year before, posted better numbers than him, and the Maple Leafs decided to go with him leading to a trade to Philadelphia. The Flyers offered up a pair of 1st round draft picks in the 1989 NHL Entry Draft in exchange for him. He joined incumbent Ron Hextall in the Philadelphia crease.

Philadelphia Flyers
During his first full year with the team, starting goaltender Ron Hextall battled a series of injuries and was limited to just eight games pushing Wregget into carrying the load.  Wregget played 51 games for Philadelphia that year before resuming the back up role the following season when Hextall returned to health.  In 1991-92, with youngster Dominic Roussel impressing during an extended look from the Flyers, Wregget was shipped to the cross-state rival Pittsburgh Penguins as part of a blockbuster transaction. The deal saw him joining the reigning champion Penguins along with Kjell Samuelsson and Rick Tocchet in exchange for Mark Recchi.

Pittsburgh Penguins
Wregget was generally backup to Penguins goaltender Tom Barrasso, although Wregget was regarded as a solid goaltender in his own right and played well in long stretches over the next few years when the oft injured Barrasso missed time. Wregget won his only career Stanley Cup as a member of the 1992 Penguins.

Wregget's best season came in 1994–95 when he played in 38 games and compiled a 25–9–2 record with a 3.21 goals against average and a .903 save percentage while also leading the NHL in wins. In 1996, he faced the first penalty shot ever awarded during an overtime period in NHL playoff history.  He stopped Washington Capitals star Joé Juneau, extending what was the third-longest game in NHL history, the longest game since 1936. The Penguins finally won 3–2 in the fourth overtime period.

Wregget also shared a majority of the work for the Penguins during the 1996–1997 season with Barrasso again injured, going 17-17-6 and getting all five playoff starts for the Penguins that season. In 1997–98 with Barrasso healthy (and having a career year himself) and the emergence of Peter Skudra and Jean-Sébastien Aubin as legitimate back-up options, Wregget was made expendable and thus traded to the Calgary Flames after the 1998 season ended with Dave Roche for German Titov and Todd Hlushko. Despite generally being the back-up in Pittsburgh, he still as of 2015 ranks 4th in Penguins' history in games played 212 (behind Fleury, Barrasso, and Herron), 3rd in wins with 104 (behind Fleury and Barrasso), and tied for 5th in shutouts with 6 (behind Fleury, Barrasso, Binkley, Hedberg, and tied with Aubin).

Calgary Flames
In Calgary, Wregget provided veteran leadership in goal during a season of transition. The 34-year old Wregget was one of six netminders to suit up for the Flames that year with many of them getting their first taste of NHL action including young Jean-Sébastien Giguère who would go on to have a sixteen-year career in the NHL. Wregget played 27 games for the Flames – one off the team lead – and posted 10 wins for the club. His 2.53 goals against average represented the best mark of his career. At seasons end, he was a free agent and left the club to take one more shot at the Stanley Cup.

Detroit Red Wings
As an unrestricted free agent for the first time in his career, Wregget signed a two-year deal with the powerful Detroit Red Wings where he backed-up Chris Osgood.  Wregget won 14-games for the Wings and posted a 2.66 goals against average. However, in 2000 he lost the backup job to Manny Legace, and so he and the Red Wings reached a deal to send him to the IHL.

Manitoba Moose
Wregget, who was born in Brandon, Manitoba, played his final season of professional hockey with the Manitoba Moose of the International Hockey League after the Red Wings loaned the veteran netminder to the club. With the Moose Wregget shared the goaltending duties with Johan Hedberg who would jump to the NHL and join Wregget's former club, the Pittsburgh Penguins for a surprising playoff run.  Wregget won 11-games for Manitoba and posted a team-best two shutouts before hanging up his pads for good at seasons end.

In 2009, he was inducted into the Manitoba Hockey Hall of Fame.

Personal life
Wregget lived in Cold Lake, Alberta, for a period of time while growing up and attended Grand Centre High School.

He and his ex-wife have a daughter, Courtney, and a son, Matthew.

He is the owner of "31" Bar and Grille in Collier Township, Pennsylvania.

Career statistics

Regular season and playoffs

Awards
 WHL East First All-Star Team – 1984
 WHL Top Goaltender Award – 1984
 Stanley Cup Champion - 1992

References

External links
 

1964 births
Calgary Flames players
Canadian ice hockey goaltenders
Detroit Red Wings players
Sportspeople from Brandon, Manitoba
Lethbridge Broncos players
Living people
Manitoba Moose (IHL) players
Philadelphia Flyers players
Pittsburgh Penguins players
St. Catharines Saints players
Stanley Cup champions
Toronto Maple Leafs draft picks
Toronto Maple Leafs players
Ice hockey people from Manitoba